Liljeborgiidae is a family of amphipods, containing the following genera:
Idunella G. O. Sars, 1894
Isipingus Barnard & Karaman, 1987
Liljeborgia Bate, 1862
Listriella Barnard, 1959

References

Gammaridea
Taxa named by Thomas Roscoe Rede Stebbing
Crustacean families